Youri may refer to:

Places
Youri, Mali, a small town and commune in south-western Mali
Youri, Niger, a village and rural commune in Niger

People
Youri Djorkaeff (born 1968), former French-Armenian football player
Youri Mulder (born 1969), former Dutch footballer
Youri Stepkine (born 1971), a Russian judoka
Youri Egorov (1954–1988), Soviet classical pianist
Youri Moltchan (born 1983), Russian foil fencer
Youri Sedykh (born 1955), a former Soviet/Ukrainian athlete
Youri Messen-Jaschin (born 1941), Swiss artist of Latvian origin
Youri Tielemans (born 1997), Belgian football midfielder
Yourii Litvinov (born 1978), Kazakhstani figure skater
Youri Ziffzer (born 1986), German ice hockey goaltender